Three-quarter back is the back-line positions of wing or centre in either rugby league or rugby union.

See also
Rugby league positions
Rugby union positions
Half back (disambiguation)
Quarter back
Fullback (disambiguation)

References

External links
Player Positions

Rugby union positions
Rugby league positions